The Man from Outback is a 1909 Australian play by Bert Bailey and Edmund Duggan written under the name of 'Albert Edmunds'.

Synopsis
Panimbla Station in the Australian outback is owned by Stephen Maitland, who is unaware that his manager is in league with a gang of cattle duffers. He is helped by his feisty daughter Mona and a mysterious stranger, Dave Goulburn.

Production
The play was clearly inspired by an earlier success of Bailey and Duggan, The Squatter's Daughter, or, The Land of the Wattle (1907). It was a success on the stage, with the part of Dave Goulburn played by Roy Redgrave. The original production was produced by William Anderson.

References

External links
The Man from Outback at AustLit

Man from Outback, The
1909 plays